Fritz Huber (born 6 April 1949 in Bad Reichenhall) is a German former wrestler who competed in the 1972 Summer Olympics.

References

External links
 

1949 births
Living people
Olympic wrestlers of West Germany
Wrestlers at the 1972 Summer Olympics
German male sport wrestlers
People from Bad Reichenhall
Sportspeople from Upper Bavaria
20th-century German people